Castellar de la Ribera is a municipality in  the comarca of the Solsonès in Catalonia, Spain. It is located in the valley of the Ribera Salada.

References

 Panareda Clopés, Josep Maria; Rios Calvet, Jaume; Rabella Vives, Josep Maria (1989). Guia de Catalunya, Barcelona: Caixa de Catalunya.  (Spanish).  (Catalan).

External links 
 
 Government data pages 

Municipalities in Solsonès
Populated places in Solsonès